The 2002 English cricket season was the 103rd in which the County Championship had been an official competition. Surrey were crowned champions but 2001 county champions Yorkshire were relegated. Yorkshire did, however, win the C&G Trophy. India and Sri Lanka toured England to compete in a Test series with England. England drew with India 1-1 and beat Sri Lanka 2-0.

Honours
County Championship - Surrey
C&G Trophy - Yorkshire
National League - Glamorgan
Benson & Hedges Cup - Warwickshire
Minor Counties Championship - Herefordshire, Norfolk (shared title)
MCCA Knockout Trophy - Warwickshire Cricket Board
Second XI Championship - Kent II 
Second XI Trophy - Kent II 
Wisden - Matthew Hayden, Adam Hollioake, Nasser Hussain, Shaun Pollock, Michael Vaughan

Events
Playing against West Indies A at the County Ground, Taunton, Somerset set a record for the highest fourth-innings total to tie a first-class match, by scoring 453.

Test series

India tour

Sri Lanka tour

County Championship

National League

C&G Trophy

Benson & Hedges Cup

Leading batsmen

Leading bowlers

References

External links
 CricketArchive – season and tournament itineraries

Annual reviews
 Playfair Cricket Annual 2003
 Wisden Cricketers' Almanack 2003

 2002